Petra Jaya State Mosque is the state mosque of Sarawak, located in Petra Jaya, Kuching, Sarawak, Malaysia. It also known as Jamek Mosque. Beside this mosque where Bangunan Bina, Masja and Pustaka Negeri Sarawak.

The mosque was opened in October 1990 by the ninth Yang di-Pertuan Agong, Sultan Azlan Shah of Perak.

See also
 Islam in Malaysia

References

Mosques in Sarawak
Buildings and structures in Kuching
1990 establishments in Malaysia
Tourist attractions in Kuching
Mosques completed in 1990